Rovnoye is an urban locality (an urban-type settlement) in Rovensky District of Saratov Oblast, Russia. Population:

References

Urban-type settlements in Saratov Oblast